Chandrayan Gutta (AZIZ COLONY) is a Locality in Old City, Hyderabad, Telangana, India.

Transport
Chandrayan Gutta is connected by buses run by TSRTC, since a Bus Depot is close by, it is well connected.

There is a MMTS train station is close by at Falaknuma.

See also
 Chandrayangutta (Assembly constituency)

References

Neighbourhoods in Hyderabad, India